Kiwaia matermea is a moth in the family Gelechiidae. It was described by Povolný in 1974. It is found in New Zealand.

References

Kiwaia
Moths described in 1974
Endemic fauna of New Zealand
Moths of New Zealand
Endemic moths of New Zealand